City Park, a  public park in New Orleans, Louisiana, is the 87th largest and 20th-most-visited urban public park in the United States. City Park is approximately 50% larger than Central Park in New York City, the municipal park recognized by Americans nationwide as the archetypal urban greenspace. Although it is an urban park whose land is owned by the City of New Orleans, it is administered by the City Park Improvement Association, an arm of state government, not by the New Orleans Parks and Parkways Department. City Park is unusual in that it is a largely self-supporting public park, with most of its annual budget derived from self-generated revenue through user fees and donations. In the wake of the enormous damage inflicted upon the park due to Hurricane Katrina, the Louisiana Department of Culture, Recreation and Tourism began to partially subsidize the park's operations.

City Park holds the world's largest collection of mature live oak trees, some older than 600 years in age. The park was founded in 1854, making it the 48th oldest park in the country, and established as the "City Park" in 1891.

History

The Dueling Oaks

The park was originally a location used for dueling. In the 1800s, men would defend their pride and honor by dueling each other under the oaks at what is now City Park but then was a normally quiet spot secluded from the rest of the city. Originally, there were two "dueling oaks," but one was lost in a hurricane in 1949.

Some of the city's most notable figures who participated in duels in City Park include Bernard de Marigny, a nobleman and president of the Louisiana Senate in 1822-23. Many of the disputes between parties were either reconciled before the duel or after one party sustained a minor injury. Dueling deaths were reported, however. In 1805, Micajah Green Lewis, Gov. William C.C. Claiborne's private secretary and brother-in-law, was killed by Robert Sterry, a Claiborne opponent. By 1890, dueling was outlawed.

New Orleans City Park lost approximately 2,000 trees after Hurricane Katrina and the federal levee failures, but the Dueling Oak still stands where Dueling Oaks Drive meets Dreyfous Drive between the Sydney and Walda Besthoff Sculpture Garden and the New Orleans Museum of Art. There’s a small sign in front of it.

Park history

City Park was established in the mid-19th century on land fronting Metairie Road (now City Park Avenue), along the remains of Bayou Metairie, a former distributary of the Mississippi River.  The tract of land, formerly the Allard Plantation, became city property in 1850 through John McDonogh's will and was reserved for park purposes. In 1854, the 4th District Court pronounced the property a public park. The park originally extended 100 acres back from City Park Avenue, as swampland covered most of the landscape between Bayou Metairie and the south shore of Lake Pontchartrain. This area, to the north of the original park, was actually platted for streets by city planners, though none was ever realized. In 1891, the City Park Improvement Association was founded, and the property was officially established as "City Park."

The carousel, originally mule-driven, opened in 1897, and was updated to a mechanical carousel in 1906. The miniature train opened in 1898 and the original golf course was built in 1902. A racetrack opened February 11, 1905, but closed only 3 years later in 1908. In the first two decades of the 20th century, numerous improvements were undertaken by the City Park Improvement Association.  The Peristyle was constructed in 1907 and the Isaac Delgado Museum of Art, later renamed the New Orleans Museum of Art, opened in 1911. Two years later, in 1913, the Casino building opened offering refreshments. The Casino building is currently occupied by Cafe Du Monde. The Popp Bandstand was constructed in 1917 and dedicated on July 4. The Irby swimming pool was built in 1924. City Park's governing board also accomplished a number of large land acquisitions, such that the park assumed its current boundaries.

In 1915, the Gen. Beauregard Equestrian Statue was erected at the entrance to City Park. On June 24, 2015, New Orleans Mayor Mitch Landrieu acknowledged the impact of the June 2015 Charleston church shooting, and called for the removal of several city memorials to Confederate slaveholders. On December 17, 2015, the New Orleans City Council voted 6-1 to remove the Gen. Beauregard statue, along with three other historical monuments; the Beauregard statue was removed on May 16, 2017.

In 1919, William McFadden purchased property on the park and built a mansion. In 1949, this mansion began to be used as Christian Brothers School, an all-boys middle school for grades 5-7, and still remains a boys' school today. In 1927, the city extended the park by 900 acres, and the first tennis courts were built in the following year. In 1928, John Philip Sousa performed at the Popp bandstand.

The park was expanded in the 1930s  due to a $12 million grant from the Works Progress Administration. A master plan, by Bennett, Parsons & Frost of Chicago was commissioned to guide the development of the greatly enlarged park; this plan was largely implemented in the 1930s by the W.P.A. This included the installation of many sculptures by WPA artist Enrique Alférez, construction of buildings, bridges, roads, and much of the electrical and plumbing infrastructure that were still serving the park when Hurricane Katrina struck in 2005. A formal rose garden was developed, the genesis of today's New Orleans Botanical Garden. The WPA also planted Couterie Forest and constructed Popp Fountain, City Park Stadium, a second 18-hole golf course - home for many years to the New Orleans Open golf tournament - and a golf clubhouse, which was later partially demolished to accommodate I-610.

Many events have taken place at Tad Gormley Stadium in City Park. Actress Dorothy Lamour from New Orleans traveled the country selling war bonds, and in 1942, made a stop in her hometown to sell war bonds in Tad Gormley stadium. Bob Hope performed in the stadium in 1944. Roy Rogers and Trigger appeared in the stadium in 1959. Even the Beatles performed in the stadium in 1964, and tickets costed just $5. In 1992, Tad Gormley Stadium was remodeled to host the US Olympic Track & Field Trials.

After World War II, two additional 18-hole golf courses were added, I-610 was constructed through the park, a new golf clubhouse was erected, the Wisner Foundation subsidized the development of a scenic parkway running almost the entire length of Bayou St. John (Wisner Boulevard), and multiple rounds of expansion and improvement occurred involving various park facilities.  By the 1970s, City Park featured four 18-hole golf courses, over 50 tennis courts, numerous other athletic fields and facilities, and the newly expanded New Orleans Museum of Art. However, as was the case with many urban parks during this period, City Park began to suffer neglect, the result of insufficient maintenance due to budget cuts. Towards the end of this period the Friends of City Park were formed (1979) to rally support and raise resources for the park.

The first City Park Big Bass Fishing Rodeo took place in the park in 1946. In 1960, 593 fishermen from around the country participated in the rodeo.

Until 1958, two years after Storyland opened, all park amenities, including the playground and Storyland, were restricted to white residents. African American children and families were banned from entering the park.

Since 1999, City Park has been the venue for the Voodoo Experience, which has become the largest of the live music events held in the park.

Hurricane Katrina in August 2005 did $43 million in damage to the park, with winds toppling an estimated 1,000 trees and damaging many more.

About 75,000 local and national volunteers assisted in repair projects that began in 2005. As of 2017, City Park is administered and being redeveloped according to its 2005 master plan, the existence of which proved invaluable to the effective channeling of rebuilding assistance in the wake of Hurricane Katrina.

The park has recovered since Hurricane Katrina with the facilities having reopened and many new attractions being added, including a water park coming soon and many future plans such as a skate park and an Environmental Education Center. A dedicated bikeway was added between Wisner Boulevard and Bayou St. John for the length of the parkway, another was installed between Bayou St. John and Marconi Drive along the park's northern boundary, and a third was introduced alongside Harrison Avenue. Most recently, a landscaped walk debuted surrounding Big Lake, adjacent to the New Orleans Museum of Art. This new amenity, called for in the park's 2005 master plan, has realized the long-held wish of surrounding neighborhoods for a pedestrian- and bicycle-only scenic walk akin to the popular facility long offered in Audubon Park, Uptown.

Facilities

Athletic facilities

 City Park Cross Country Course
 City Park Disc Golf Course
 City Park Driving Range
 City Park Golf Courses
 City Park/Pepsi Tennis Center
 City Park Practice Track
 City Park Rugby Pitch
 City Putt
 Lagoon Soccer Fields
 Matt Savoie Soccer Complex
 Pan American Stadium
 Quadruplex (Softball)
 Rotary Baseball Field
 Scout Island Athletic Fields (Lacrosse)
 Tad Gormley Stadium

Attractions and Recreation
 Bike and Boat Rentals
 Carousel Gardens Amusement Park
 Celebration in the Oaks
 Christian Brothers School
 City Park Birding Corridor
 Couturie Forest: this 60-acre forest is made up of eight distinct ecosystems and is home to New Orleans’ highest point of elevation: Laborde Mountain. The entrance to the forest is on Harrison Avenue.
 Dog Park
 Festival Grounds
 Fishing

 Gift Shop and Welcome Center
 Gondola Rides
 Goldring/Woldenberg Great Lawn
 Helis Foundation Enrique Alférez Sculpture Garden
 Historic Structures
 Horse Stables
 Louisiana Children's Museum
 New Orleans Botanical Garden
 New Orleans Museum of Art, considered one of the finest art museums in the South
 Storyland

 Sydney and Walda Besthoff Sculpture Garden
 Trails: Zemurray Trail, Couturie Trail, Scout Island Trail, and bike paths
 Water Park
 Weddings & Catering
 Wildflower fields

Dining
 Ralph's on the Park
 Cafe Du Monde 
 Parker’s Café
 Parker’s Pizza

References

External links

 New Orleans City Park official website
 Celebration in the Oaks
 Friends of City Park
 Equest Farm
 New Orleans Museum of Art and Besthoff Sculpture Garden
 New Orleans City Park Amusement Park Photos

Music venues in Louisiana
Parks in New Orleans
Works Progress Administration in Louisiana
1854 establishments in Louisiana